The women's pole vault at the 2013 World Championships in Athletics was held at the Luzhniki Stadium on 11–13 August.

Missing on her first attempt, home stadium favorite and world record holder Yelena Isinbayeva found herself in third place behind Silke Spiegelburg and Jennifer Suhr, both of whom were perfect to 4.75.  Along with Yarisley Silva, who struggled with misses at several heights, these four athletes went to 4.82, where Suhr and Isinbaeva made it on their second attempts, giving Suhr the lead, Silva on her third and Spiegelburg bowed out.  At 4.89, Isinbaeva moved into first place with a first attempt clearance.  Suhr and then Silva failed to negotiate the same height. Isinbayeva then took three attempts at her own world record, but failed.

Records
Prior to the competition, the established records were as follows.

Qualification standards

Schedule

Results

Qualification
Qualification: 4.60 m (Q) and at least 12 best (q) advanced to the final.

Final
The final was started at 19:35.

References

External links
Pole vault results at IAAF website

Pole vault
Pole vault at the World Athletics Championships
2013 in women's athletics